Jidayi is a surname. Notable people with the surname include:

Christian Jidayi (born 1987), Italian footballer
William Jidayi (born 1984), Italian footballer